Robert Meyler was a sailor from Wexford who was martyred for his Roman Catholic faith on 5 July 1581 AD. He was hanged, drawn and quartered in the town for his refusal to take the Oath of Supremacy, thereby renouncing his Catholic faith. Robert was apparently tortured, before being executed alongside Patrick Kavanagh, Edward Cheevers and Matthew Lambert. These men were beatified in 1992 by Pope John Paul II.

References

16th-century Roman Catholic martyrs
1580 deaths
People from Wexford